Abriachan (Gaelic: Obar Itheachan), is a village in the Highland council area of Scotland. It is situated high above the western shore of Loch Ness, 15 km to the south-west of the city of Inverness. The village has a population of approximately 120. There are no schools in Abriachan, so children travel by bus into Inverness or to Dochgarroch or Tomnacross for their education.

At the bottom of the Abriachan hill, where the Kilianan stream meets Loch Ness, is Abriachan Garden Nursery, with a woodland walk and plant selling area.

GPost office
Abriachan post office opened on 25 July 1882, and for many years from the early 1960s was run by Katharine Stewart and her family. An account of life in the Highlands, and of its postal services, was published in 1997. The post office closed on 8 April 2008.

Abriachan Forest

Abriachan Forest is an upland area of conifer forest and open hillside, covering 536 hectares, It was owned by the Forestry Commission until 1998, when it was sold to Abriachan Forest Trust for £152,000. Abriachan Forest Trust is a community group formed to buy and manage the forest, and they are working to encourage recreational and educational use of the forest. They have developed a number of paths and mountain bike trails around the area, including the Great Glen Way long-distance path passing through.

Notable residents
John Somerville, accordion player with Croft No. Five and Box Club
John Barr, international shinty player
Gregor Borland, Internationally acclaimed Scottish Fiddle player. Also part of folk trio [Other Roads].

See also
Aber and Inver as place-name elements

References

External links 
 Abriachan community website

Populated places in Inverness committee area
Community buyouts in Scotland
Loch Ness